Quién Eres Tú may refer to:

"Quién Eres Tú" (Yuri song), 1990
"Quién Eres Tú" (Luis Enrique song), 1994
"Quién Eres Tú", 2004 song by Frank Reyes
¿Quién Eres Tú?", 2007 song by María José from the album María José
¿Quién eres tú?, a 2012 telenovela